Dismember (also known by members as the Untitled album) is the eighth studio album by death metal band Dismember. It was released February 18, 2008 by Regain Records, and was their last studio album before an eight-year hiatus from recording and performing. A promotional copy of this album was leaked onto file sharing networks in early 2008.

Track listing

Personnel

Dismember
 Matti Kärki - vocals
 David Blomqvist - guitars
 Martin Persson - guitars
 Tobias Cristiansson - bass
 Thomas Daun - drums

Production
 Nico Elgstrand - mixing, recording
 Craig Rogers - cover art
 Soren Von Malmborg - mastering

References

Dismember (band) albums
2008 albums
Regain Records albums